Albritton McClain (born March 19, 1952) is an American rock guitarist who is best known for being a member of Donnie Iris and the Cruisers. McClain played the bass guitar on the band's early albums during the 1980s and on Poletown in 1997.

References

Living people
American rock bass guitarists
American male bass guitarists
Donnie Iris and the Cruisers members
Musicians from Pittsburgh
Les Variations members
20th-century American bass guitarists
1952 births
Guitarists from Pennsylvania
20th-century American male musicians
The Innocent (band) members